Arylakh is a rural locality (a selo) and the administrative center of Tyubyay-Zharkhansky Rural Okrug of Suntarsky District in the Sakha Republic, Russia, located  from Suntar, the administrative center of the district. Its population as of the 2002 Census was 643.

References

Notes

Sources
Official website of the Sakha Republic. Registry of the Administrative-Territorial Divisions of the Sakha Republic. Suntarsky District. 

Rural localities in Suntarsky District